Cabinet of Anders Fogh Rasmussen may refer to:

Cabinet of Anders Fogh Rasmussen I, formed after the 2001 Danish parliamentary election
Cabinet of Anders Fogh Rasmussen II, formed after the 2005 Danish parliamentary election
Cabinet of Anders Fogh Rasmussen III, formed after the 2007 Danish parliamentary election